Star Sports Network also known as Star Sports is a group of South Asian pay television sports channels owned by The Walt Disney Company India. wholly owned by The Walt Disney Company.

The networks were initially formed in 1991 as a joint venture between Star and Tele-Communications Inc. (TCI) known as Prime Sports, taking their name from TCI's U.S. regional sports networks of the same name. In 1996, Star agreed to merge its sports networks in Asia with ESPN's, forming ESPN Star Sports. In June 2012, News Corporation acquired ESPN's stake in the joint venture.

Star Sports is a major broadcaster of cricket in India, holding the pay television rights to domestic national team matches, the Indian Premier League, and International Cricket Council (ICC) tournaments. Streaming rights to many Star Sports properties are held in India by sister streaming service Disney+ Hotstar.

History 
Hong Kong-based Star TV launched Prime Sports (later renamed Star Sports) in partnership with American company TCI, which owned Prime-branded regional sports channels. The channel was broadcast across Asia, including India, as with the footprint of AsiaSat 7. Star TV has since regionalized the channel with several versions. Later, ESPN joined the region as a competitor to Star Sports.

ESPN and Star Sports were competing against each other across Asia. But in October 1996, both channels agreed to combine their operations in the region. As a result, a joint venture named ESPN Star Sports was formed, to be headquartered in Singapore. The joint venture's business in India was managed by its subsidiary, ESPN Software India Private Limited.

In June 2012, it was announced that Star TV, by then owned by News Corporation, would acquire ESPN's share in ESPN Star Sports. The sale was completed in January 2013. On 11 March 2013, Star Sports 2, a Hindi-language sports channel, was launched as a sister channel to Star Sports, Star Cricket and ESPN.

On 6 November 2013, Star Sports introduced a new brand identity and re-aligned its channels in India; Star Sports became Star Sports 1; Star Cricket became Star Sports 3, a Hindi language channel; ESPN became Star Sports 4, a Tamil language channel, and Star Cricket HD and ESPN HD became Star Sports HD1 and HD2 respectively. In Hong Kong, Taiwan and Southeast Asia, the ESPN Star Sports channels were relaunched by Fox International Channels Asia Pacific as Fox Sports.  ESPN International later established a partnership with Multi-Screen Media in October 2015, which rebranded Sony Kix as Sony ESPN in January 2016.

Star India planned to replace the troubled Channel V India with Star Sports 1 Kannada on 16 November 2017, but the delay in regulatory approval meant the plan was postponed. Later, Star India replaced Channel V into the current iteration of Star Sports 3 on 15 September 2018, and launched Star Sports 1 Telugu and Star Sports 1 Kannada as new channels on 7 and 29 December 2018, respectively. In the meantime, the Kannada commentary of Star Sports' coverage of the Indian Premier League was broadcast on Star Suvarna.

Ahead of the 2023 Indian Premier League, Star Sports announced that it would launch Star Sports 1 Tamil and Telugu feeds in HD on 15 March 2023, but with the Bangla and Marathi feeds being concurrently discontinued.

Channels

Former channels

Programming

See also 
 Fox Sports Asia (formerly ESPN Star Sports)

References

External links
 

Star Sports
Cable television in India
Sports television networks in India
English-language television stations in India
Disney Star
Prime Sports
Television channels and stations established in 1991
Indian Premier League on television